A press release is an official statement delivered to members of the news media for the purpose of providing information, creating an official statement, or making an announcement directed for public release. Press releases are also considered a primary source, meaning they are original informants for information. A press release is traditionally composed of nine structural elements, including a headline, dateline, introduction, body, and other components. Press releases are typically delivered to news media electronically, ready to use, and often subject to "do not use before" time, known as a news embargo.  

A special example of a press release is a communiqué, which is a brief report or statement released by a public agency. A communiqué is typically issued after a high-level meeting of international leaders.

Using press release material can benefit media corporations because they help decrease costs and improve the amount of material a media firm can output in a certain amount of time. Due to the material being pre-packaged, press releases save journalists time, not only in writing a story, but also the time and money it would have taken to capture the news firsthand.

Although using a press release can thus save a news outlet time and money, it constrains the format and style of its content. In addition, press releases are favorable towards the organization that commissioned them, framing the topic according to its preferred criteria. In the digital age, consumers want to get their information instantly, bringing about pressure on the news media to output as much material as possible. This may cause news media companies to heavily rely on press releases to create stories.

Elements

Any information deliberately sent to a reporter or media source is considered a press release. This information is released by the act of being sent to the media. Public relations professionals often follow a standard professional format for press releases. Additional communication methods that journalists employ include pitch letters and media advisories. Generally, a press release body consists of four to five paragraphs with a word limit ranging from 400 to 500. Press release length can range from 300 to 800 words.

Common structural elements include:
 Letterhead or Logo
 Media Contact Information – name, phone number, email address, mailing address, or other contact information for the public relation (PR) or other media relations contact person.
 Headline – used to grab the attention of journalists and briefly summarize the news in one to six words. 
 Dek – a sub-headline that describes the headline in more detail.
 Dateline – contains the release date and usually the originating city of the press release. If the date listed is after the date that the information was actually sent to the media, then the sender is requesting a news embargo.
 Introduction – first paragraph in a press release, that generally gives basic answers to the questions of who, what, when, where and why.
 Body – further explanation, statistics, background, or other details relevant to the news.
 Boilerplate – generally a short "about" section, providing independent background on the issuing company, organization, or individual.
 Close – in North America, traditionally the symbol "-30-" appears after the boilerplate or body and before the media contact information, indicating to media that the release has ended. A more modern equivalent has been the "###" symbol. In other countries, other means of indicating the end of the release may be used, such as the text "ends".

As the Internet has assumed growing prominence in the 24-hour news cycle, press release writing styles have evolved. Editors of online newsletters, for instance, often lack the staff to convert traditional press release prose into the print-ready copy.

Distribution models
In the traditional distribution model, the business, political campaign, or other entity releasing information to the media hires a publicity agency to write and distribute written information to the newswires. The newswire then scatters the information as it is received or as investigated by a journalist. Thus, resulting in the information or announcement becoming public knowledge.

An alternative model is the self-published press release. In this approach, press releases are either sent directly to local newspapers or to free and paid distribution services. The distribution service then provides the content, as-is, to their media outlets for publication which is usually communicated via online. This approach is often used by political institutions, for example. Another instance would be, Constitutional Courts in Europe, U.S. Supreme Court, and the U.S. State Supreme Courts issue press releases about their own decisions and the news media use these self-published releases for their reporting.

Video

Some public relations firms send out video news releases (VNRs) which are pre-taped video programs or clips that can be aired intact by TV stations.

Video news releases may include interviews of movie-stars. These interviews, which have been taped on a set, are located at the movie studio and decorated with the movie's logo.

Video news releases can be in the form of full-blown productions as well. This costs tens of thousands or even hundreds of thousands of dollars to be produced. Video news releases can also be in the format of TV news, or even produced specifically for the web.

Some broadcast news outlets have discouraged the use of video news releases because of citing a poor public perception. It could also be viewed as a desire to increase their credibility.

Furthermore, VNRs can be turned into podcasts and then posted onto newswires. A story can also be kept running longer by simply engaging "community websites". "Community websites" are monitored and commented on by many journalists and feature writers.

Embargoes
If a press release is distributed before the information is intended to be released to the public it is considered embargoed. An embargo requests that news organizations not report the story until a specified date or time.

Unless the journalist has signed a legally binding non-disclosure agreement agreeing to honor the embargo in advance, the journalist has no legal obligation to withhold the information. However, violating the embargo risks damaging their relationship with the issuing organization and their reputation as a writer or journalist. News organizations are sometimes blacklisted after breaking an embargo.

History 

Ivy Lee, known as the father of modern public relations, was the first to make a press release. The press release was made in October 1906. The first press release, covered by Lee, was of a railroad accident involving the Pennsylvania Railroad. The accident caused the death of fifty people in Atlantic City, New Jersey (known as the Atlantic City train wreck). Lee documented the accident and gave out reports to fellow reporters. The biggest turning point was the honesty that Lee wrote regarding the accident and how truthful it was. Lee's words were so impactful and precise that the New York Times distributed his exact statement and observations. 

Lee was, and still is, one of the biggest influences and front runners in public relations and press releases. On the account of Lee, press releases have evolved into a necessity for key details among companies to disclose to the public. Since then, press releases have been used to inform other journalists, PR's, and other media relation people of important events, statistics, and announcements.

Other sources 
 Electronic press kit (EPK)
 List of press release agencies
 Mat release
 News conference
 Spokesman
 Press service
 Science by press release
 Submission software

References 

Sources (journalism)
Public relations techniques